The Mount Pocdol, also known as the Bacon-Manito Volcanic Group are a volcanic group of stratovolcanoes in the Philippines.

Location
The Pocdol Mountains form part of the boundary between the provinces of Albay and Sorsogon, in Region V, on the island of Luzon, in the Philippines.

The group is located south-east of Mayon Volcano, between Albay Gulf and Sorsogon Bay, at latitude 13.05°N (13°3'0"N), longitude 123.958°E (123°57'30"E).

Physical features

There are several peaks above 1000 metres in elevation.

A fumarole field that contains solfataras and chloride hot springs, is reported to be located near the summit of the volcanic group.

The group is described by the Smithsonian Institution's Global Volcanism Program as fumarolic.

Eruptions
There are no reports of eruptions.

Geology
Several Pleistocene K-Ar dates have been obtained from the volcanic complex. Most igneous rocks in the Pocdol Mountains consist of pyroxene andesites with minor amounts of dacite and basalts. The area is traversed by the San Vicente-Linao Fault, a splay of the Philippine Fault.

Volcanic cones in the western part of the complex are dissected, but those in the eastern part are morphologically youthful.

The volcanic area is the host of various geothermal systems collectively called the Bacon-Manito geothermal field.

Listings
The Global Volcanism Program lists the Pocdol Mountains as Fumarolic.
Philippine Institute of Volcanology and Seismology (PHIVOLCS) lists Pocdol Mountains as Inactive.

See also
List of active volcanoes in the Philippines
List of potentially active volcanoes in the Philippines
List of inactive volcanoes in the Philippines
Philippine Institute of Volcanology and Seismology
Pacific ring of fire
Volcanic group

References

External links
Philippine Institute of Volcanology and Seismology (PHIVOLCS) List of Inactive Volcanoes

Stratovolcanoes of the Philippines
Subduction volcanoes
Volcanoes of Luzon
Mountains of the Philippines
Landforms of Albay
Landforms of Sorsogon
Volcanic groups
Inactive volcanoes of the Philippines